The Homer Spit (Dena'ina: Uzintun) is a geographical landmark located in Homer, Alaska on the southern tip of the Kenai Peninsula. The spit is also home to the Homer Boat Harbor. The harbor contains both deep and shallow water docks and serves up to 1500 commercial and pleasure boats at its summer peak. Additional features and attractions include  The Nick Dudiak Fishing Lagoon, which is an artificial "fishing hole", campgrounds, hotels, and restaurants and the Salty Dawg Saloon, which is constructed out of several historic buildings from Homer. Hundreds of eagles formerly gathered there in winter to be fed by Jean Keene, the "Eagle Lady". The Spit features the longest road into ocean waters in the entire world, taking up 10–15 minutes to cover by car.

History

Two different theories postulate that the spit originates either from the tidal swells and currents of Cook Inlet and Kachemak Bay over millennia of sand buildup, or that it was pushed into place by now-retreated glaciers. The Dena'ina called the spit Uzintun, meaning "extends out into the distance". In 1899, the Cook Inlet Coal Fields Company laid a railroad track along the spit, connecting the docks to the coal fields along Kachemak Bay. The resulting business led to the development of what eventually became Homer, Alaska. In the 1960s, several hippies, known as "spit rats", traveled from all around to camp on the Homer Spit, many of them becoming successful commercial fishermen over time.

Nick Dudiak Fishing Lagoon
This artificial lagoon is known locally as the "fishing hole". Every spring it is stocked with salmon fry from the Trail Lakes hatchery facility. The fry are fed by volunteers so that they will imprint on the location in the normal manner of salmon. They then proceed to live normal lives as wild salmon, returning as adults to the lagoon due to their instinctual desire to mate and spawn. The lagoon is a popular attraction for both tourists and locals, as it is an easily accessible and inexpensive salmon fishery. There is even a ramp for those who have to use wheelchairs. During the summer months it can become very crowded if there is an active salmon run occurring, and there is additional competition from harbor seals who often enter the lagoon to chase salmon. The official name is a tribute to the biologist from the Alaska Department of Fish and Game who proposed the idea and managed the project.

Potential threats
Tsunamis are also a known threat. An explosion from the nearby Augustine Volcano could bring a giant wave to the Spit within minutes, giving residents very little time to react. However, most tsunamis from other areas in the ocean would probably give Spit-dwellers enough time to get to safety, due to the early warning system operated by the  West Coast/Alaska Tsunami Warning Center (WC/ATWC) in Palmer, Alaska. Erosion of the Spit has also been a developing problem over the years, as the ocean side is exposed to heavy waves.

References

External links
Boat Harbor Map

Homer, Alaska
Headlands of Alaska
Landforms of Kenai Peninsula Borough, Alaska
Spits of the United States